The Women's 25K race at the 8th FINA World Aquatics Championships swam on January 11, 1998, in the ocean off Perth, Western Australia.

Results

References

World Aquatics Championships
Open water swimming at the 1998 World Aquatics Championships
1998 in women's swimming